Naomi Visser (born 24 August 2001) is a Dutch artistic gymnast.  She was part of the bronze medal winning team at the 2018 European Championships.

Early life 
Visser was born in 2001 in Papendrecht.  She started gymnastics at the age of six.

Gymnastics career

Senior 
At the 2018 European Championships, Visser helped the Netherlands win the team bronze medal. At the 2018 World Championships, she finished 14th in the all-around.

At the 2019 European Games, Visser finished seventh in the all-around and fifth on uneven bars. At the 2019 World Championships, she helped the Netherlands team finish eighth and finished 23rd in the all-around.

2021 
At the 2021 European Championships Visser finished ninth in the all-around.  She was initially an alternate for the Dutch team at the 2020 Olympic Games; however she tested positive for COVID-19 only weeks prior to departure for Tokyo and was unable to travel.  In October Visser competed at the World Championships in Kitakyushu.  She qualified to the all-around final where she finished fifth.  In doing so she set a record as the highest placing Dutch female artistic gymnast in a World all-around final.

2022 
Visser competed at the Baku World Cup where she won silver on the uneven bars behind Lorette Charpy.  At the 2022 European Championships in Munich, Visser helped the Netherlands qualify to the team final, where they finished fourth behind Italy, Great Britain, and Germany. Individually Visser finished sixth in the all-around, sixth on floor exercise, and seventh on the uneven bars.  At the World Championships Visser qualified to three individual finals: all-around, uneven bars, and floor exercise.  She finished eighteenth in the all-around, seventh on uneven bars, and fifth on floor exercise.

Competitive history

References

2001 births
Living people
Dutch female artistic gymnasts
Gymnasts at the 2019 European Games
European Games competitors for the Netherlands
People from Papendrecht
Sportspeople from South Holland
21st-century Dutch women